Géraldine Reuteler (born 21 April 1999) is a Swiss footballer who plays as a defender for German Frauen-Bundesliga club Eintracht Frankfurt and the Switzerland national team.

She played for Switzerland at UEFA Women's Euro 2017.

International goals

Notes

References

External links
 

1999 births
Living people
Swiss women's footballers
Switzerland women's international footballers
1. FFC Frankfurt players
Eintracht Frankfurt (women) players
Women's association football defenders
Frauen-Bundesliga players
Swiss expatriate sportspeople in Germany
Swiss expatriate women's footballers
Expatriate sportspeople in Germany
Swiss Women's Super League players
Sportspeople from Nidwalden
UEFA Women's Euro 2022 players
UEFA Women's Euro 2017 players
21st-century Swiss women